The list of provincial parks of the British Columbia Central Interior contains the provincial parks located within this geographic region of the province of British Columbia. It includes parks from the three regional districts of Bulkley-Nechako, Cariboo, and Fraser-Fort George. These parks are administered by BC Parks under the jurisdiction of the Ministry of Environment and Climate Change Strategy.

The most visited provincial park of this region is Mount Robson Provincial Park with 205,559 total visitors and 64,673 overnight campers during the 2017/2018 season.

List of parks

Gallery

References

External links 

Map of provincial parks in the Central Interior on env.gov.bc.ca

 
Provincial parks
British Columbia, Central Interior
Provincial parks